Engelbert II (died 13 April 1141), a member of the House of Sponheim, was Margrave of Istria and Carniola from about 1103/07 until 1124. In 1123, he succeeded his elder brother Henry as Duke of Carinthia and Margrave of Verona which he held until his retirement in 1135.

Life
Engelbert II was the son of Count Engelbert I of Sponheim (d. 1096) and his wife Hedwig of uncertain descent, maybe a daughter of the Billung duke Bernard II of Saxony. His grandfather Count Siegfried I of Sponheim (d. 1065) came to Carinthia about 1035 as an attendant of Emperor Conrad II.

In 1099 Pope Urban II appointed Engelbert II Vogt protector of Saint Paul's Abbey, founded by his father. About 1100 he established the County of Kraiburg on the inherited estates of his wife Uta, daughter of Burgrave Ulric of Passau. He also acquired two castles in the Trixen valley near Völkermarkt from the Bishop of Gurk and the market town of Friesach in 1106. About 1107 he was elevated to a margrave in Istria and Carniola, succeeding Count Ulric II of Weimar.

Unlike his father, Engelbert II was a loyal supporter of the ruling Salian dynasty and also a fierce opponent of Archbishop Conrad I of Salzburg in the yet unresolved Investiture Controversy. He stood as guarantor of German king Henry V at his coronation as Holy Roman Emperor in February 1111 and witnessed the Concordat of Worms with Pope Callixtus II in September 1122. In the same year his elder brother Henry IV was created Duke of Carinthia and Margrave of Verona, and upon his death in 1123 Engelbert II succeeded him. The next year he ceded Istria to his son Engelbert III.

In 1135 Engelbert II renounced Carinthia and Verona, whereafter Emperor Lothair II enfeoffed his son Ulrich I. Engelbert retired to Seeon Abbey in the Bavarian Chiemgau, where he died on 13 April 1141.

Marriage and issue
About 1103 he married Uta, daughter of Burgrave Ulric of Passau (died 2 February 1099). Together they were the parents of the following children:
Ulric I, succeeded his father in Carinthia in 1135
Engelbert III, succeeded his father in Istria, Carniola and Kraiburg in 1124
Henry, Bishop of Troyes in 1145
Matilda, married Count Theobald the Great of Blois-Champagne
Rapoto I, Count of Ortenburg in 1130 and Kraiburg in 1173
Adelheid, Abbess of Göss in 1146
Hartwig II, Bishop of Regensburg in 1155
Ida, married Count William III of Nevers

References

Sources

1141 deaths
12th-century people of the Holy Roman Empire
Margraves of Istria
Margraves of Carniola
Dukes of Carinthia
House of Sponheim
Austrian people of German descent
Year of birth unknown